The Carlos Palanca Memorial Awards for Literature winners in the year 2004 (rank, name of author, title of winning entry):


English division
Futuristic Fiction
First prize: Irene Carolina Sarmiento, "They Don't Bite"
Second prize: Catherine Rose Torres, "Niche"
Third prize: Dean Francis Alfar, "Hollow Girl: A Romance" 

Short story
First prize: Asterio Enrico Gutierrez, "Blind"
Second prize: Socorro Villanueva, "Foggy Makes Me Sad"
Third prize: Paul de Guzman, "The Index of Forbidden Books." 

Short story for children
First prize: Victoria Estrella Bravo, "The Cat Painter"
Second prize: Maria Celeste Flores, "Touch Ball" 
Third prize: C. Horatius Mosquera, "The Boy Who Had Three Brains" 

Essay
First prize: Wilfredo Pascual Jr., "Devotion" 
Second prize: Erwin Romulo, "Confessions of a Space Boy"
Third prize: Jose Maria Alarilla, "Surviving the Zeroes" 

Poetry 
First prize: Naya Valdellon, "Casual Ties"
Second prize: Joel Toledo, "Literature and Other Poems" 
Third prize: Angelo Suarez, "Else It Was Purely Girls"

One-act play 
First prize: Glenn Mas, "Her Father's House" 
Second prize: Dean Francis Alfar, "The Kite of Stars"
Third prize: Robert Arlo de Guzman, "Sakura"

Full-length play
First prize: Isagani Cruz, "The Lovely Bienvenido N. Santos"
Second prize: Anna Felicia Sanchez, "In Search of a Storybook Dragon"
Third prize: Glenn Sevilla Mas, "Rite of Passage"

Filipino division
Futuristic Fiction
First prize: Charles Bryan Acosta, " Dalawang Butil ng Asukal at Bigas"

Maikiling Kuwento
First prize: Honorio Bartolome De Dios, "Etong Bayad, Sang Kalayaan Lang
Second prize: Clarito Garcia de Francia, "Mik-Eng"
Third prize: Johannes Chua, "Dinuguan" 

Maikling Kuwentong Pambata
First prize: No Winner
Second prize: Eugene Evasco, "Si Mabait at Ang Mga Daliri ng Liwanag"
Third prize: Russell Roland Molina, "Tuwing Sabado" 

Sanaysay
First prize: Luna Sicat Cleto, "Balanse"
Second prize: Mary Grace Mendoza, "Suson-susong Suso"
Third prize: Melecio Antonio Adviento III, "Diwa ng Manlalakbay" 

Tula
First prize: Edgar Samar, "Tayong Lumalakad Nang Matulin"
Second prize: Joseph Rosmon Tuazon, "Puti ang Anino ng Minsang Narito"
Third prize: Renato Santos' "Sa Mall ng Mega-buhay-buhay" 

Dulang May Isang Yugto
First prize: Nicolas Pichay, "Pangulo Naming Mahal" 
Second prize: Rodolfo C. Vera, "Mga Aswang sa Panahon ng Digmaan"
Third prize: George de Jesus III, "Unang Ulang ng Mayo" 

Dulang Ganap ang Haba 
First prize: Nicolas Pichay, "Psychedelia Apocalypsis"
Second prize: Jeanne Lim, "Gulong"
Third prize: Allan Lopez, "Anatomiya ng Pag-ibig"

Dulang Pantelebisyon
First prize: Lourd Ernest De Veyra and Homer Novicio, "Tugtog Tinapay"
Second prize: Ma. Clarissa Estuar, "Riles"
Third prize: Ramon Orbeta, "Adik sa TV"

Dulang Pampelikula
First prize: Mark Meily, "Good Friday Archipelago"
Second prize: Ma. Abigael Malonzo, "Snapshots" 
Third prize: Jose Maria Manalo, "Adoboville"

Regional Language division
Short story-Cebuano
First prize: Arnel Mardoquio, "Ang Katapusang Sonata sa Clarinet ni Nikolet"
Second prize: Agustin Pagusara Jr., "Talia Migrante"
Third prize: Gumer Rafanan, "Gutom"

Short story-Hiligaynon
First prize: Winton Lou Ynion, "Sinipad sa Balaan Bukid"
Second prize: Genevieve L. Asenjo, "Si Beryong Balikbayan"
Third prize: John Iremil Teodoro, "Balaan"

Short story-Iluko
First prize: Prescillano Bermudez, "Apong Gabriel, Pundador"
Second prize: Daniel Nesperos, "Opas"
Third prize: Severino Pablo, "Silaw a Makidinnaeg iti Di Maungpot nga Isisingising ti Init"

Kabataan essay division
Essay
First prize: Charles Bryan Acosta, "My Philosophy" 
Second prize: Marc Gregory Yu, "To Be President? Why Not" 
Third prize: Marie Kristine Reyes, "In Over-anticipation of the Future" 

Sanaysay
First prize: Marylaine Louise Viernes, "Iboto! Ako Para Pangulo"
Second prize: Cassandra Czarina Yap, "Kung Ako ay Presidente ng Pilipinas"
Third prize: Mark Christopher delos Angeles Deatras, "Kapitan"

More winners by year

References
http://www.geocities.com/palanca_awards/2004.html(  2009-10-23)

2004
Palanca